Leyla Tuifua (born ) is a French female former volleyball player, playing as a setter. She was part of the France women's national volleyball team.

She competed at the 2013 Women's European Volleyball Championship. On club level she played for Vennelles VB.

References

1986 births
Living people
French women's volleyball players
Wallis and Futuna women's volleyball players
Competitors at the 2013 Mediterranean Games
Mediterranean Games competitors for France